Mickūnai is a town in Vilnius district municipality, in Vilnius County, in southeast Lithuania, it is located only about  north-east of Vilnius city municipality. According to the 2011 census, the town has a population of 1,389 people.

References 

Vilnius district municipality
Towns in Vilnius County
Towns in Lithuania
Vilna Governorate
Wilno Voivodeship (1926–1939)